Cleo Anthony is an American actor.

Anthony has been cast as one of the three male leads in Spike Lee's 10-episode 2017 Netflix series She's Gotta Have It, a contemporary updating of Lee's 1986 film.

Selected television

References

External links

Living people
American male film actors
American male television actors
Year of birth missing (living people)
Place of birth missing (living people)
21st-century American male actors